The 2002–2003 Chinese protest movement was general strikes, occupations, strike actions, riots, wildcat strikes and picketing in China’s poorer areas against the division between rich and poor, unemployment, poverty, poor living standards and inequality. Mass protests began as early as January–February 2002, when a tide of protests swept Changping and Tibet. People from all ages, cultures, areas nationwide all came out onto the streets, protesting the government's closures of factories, corruption, Low wages and unemployment among young and old people and many more deep issues. Labour protests swept Sichuan, Tibet, Shenyang and Tianjin. The demonstrators were protesting the government crackdown on protests in Liaoyang in 2002, when 30,000 protesters took to the streets protesting the closure of a brick factory for 3 months; it was the biggest labour uprising since 1976. Protesters tactics was nonviolent boycotts, civil disobedience and marches while police's tactics was tear gas, detain and live ammunition. In Sichuan in 2004, mass protests against the treatment of workers and civilians in slums occurred by 25,000 pensioners and students. 1 was killed in a crackdown on public protests in October 2004 there. In the early months of 2003, labour unrest and wildcat strikes rocked Shenyang by workers in sit-ins against unemployment and poverty. Police would fire on demonstrators, arrest and make protesters detainees. The protests led to the death of 1 demonstrator.

See also
 1989 Tiananmen Square protests
 2010 Chinese labour unrest
 2022 COVID-19 protests in China

References

2002 protests
2003 protests
Protests in China